The Minnesota Golden Gophers women's hockey team represented the University of Minnesota in the 2011–12 NCAA Division I women's ice hockey season. The Gophers won their third NCAA women's Frozen Four championship.

Offseason

News and notes
August 8: Four Golden Gophers will participate at the USA Hockey Festival. The festival will occur from August 10 to the 20th at the Schwann Super Rink in Blaine, Minnesota. Megan Bozek, Amanda Kessel, Jen Schoullis and former Gopher Gigi Marvin were invited.
August 19: USA Hockey announced today the members of the U.S. Women's National Team that will compete in the 2011 IIHF 12 Nations Tournament Series, Aug. 24–31, in Vierumäki, Finland. The 22-player roster includes two current University of Minnesota players in sophomore forward Amanda Kessel and Jen Schoullis.

Recruiting

Exhibition

East-West showcase
All games will be contested at Ridder Arena

Regular season
October 14: Jen Schoullis and Amanda Kessel, were named to the Team USA roster that will participate in the 2011 Four Nations Cup from Nov. 9–13 in Sweden. In addition, former Gophers player Gigi Marvin was named to the roster.
October 16: The Gophers defeated the top ranked Wisconsin Badgers in Madison, Wisconsin by a 3–2 tally. It was the first loss for the Badgers since November 2010. In addition, the Gophers earned their first win at the Kohl Centre since 2007.
November 18: Minnesota skater Amanda Kessel registered 5 points (including four goals)as the Golden Gophers defeated the New Hampshire Wildcats by an 11–0 tally. New Hampshire starting goalie Jenn Gilligan made 27 saves but allowed eight goals in two periods. She was replaced by Moe Bradley in the third period. Bradley stopped 11 of 14 shots as the Wildcats suffered their worst loss in the 35 year history of the program.
November 19: Kessel earned her second hat trick of the series as the Gophers defeated New Hampshire by a 6–1 tally. Senior Jen Schoullis factored on every goal, as she tied the Gophers record for assists in a game with five. With three points in the first period, Schoullis also set a career record for points in a period.

Standings

Roster

Awards and honors
Rachael Bona, WCHA Rookie of the Week (Week of January 23, 2012)
Megan Bozek, WCHA Defensive Player of the Week (Week of December 7, 2011)
Alyssa Grogan, Nominee, 2012 Hockey Humanitarian Award	
Amanda Kessel, WCHA Co-Offensive Player of the Week (Week of October 12, 2011)
Amanda Kessel, WCHA Co-Offensive Player of the Week (Week of November 21, 2011)
Amanda Kessel, WCHA Player of the Week (Week of February 8, 2012)
Noora Raty, WCHA Defensive Player of the Week (Week of November 8, 2011)
Emily West, WCHA Player of the Week (Week of February 1, 2012)

Postseason awards
Noora Raty, 2012 NCAA Frozen Four Most Outstanding Player
Megan Bozek, 2011–12 CCM Hockey Women’s Division I All-American: First Team
Megan Bozek, 2011–12 Minnesota Golden Gophers Female Athlete of the Year
Anne Schleper, 2012 Big Ten Medal of Honor

References

Minnesota
Minnesota Golden Gophers women's ice hockey seasons
NCAA women's ice hockey Frozen Four seasons
NCAA women's ice hockey championship seasons
Minn
Minne
Minne